The 2023 Virginia Cavaliers baseball team will represent the University of Virginia during the 2023 NCAA Division I baseball season. The Cavaliers will play their home games at Davenport Field as a members of the Atlantic Coast Conference. They were led by head coach Brian O'Connor, in his 20th season at Virginia.

Previous season 

The 2022 team finished 39–19 overall, and 17–13 in ACC play, to finish in third place in the Coastal Division. The Cavaliers went 0–2 in pool play and were unable to advance. They received an at-large bid to the NCAA Tournament and were the second seed in the Greenville Regional. They won their first game against third seed Coastal Carolina, but then lost to first seed East Carolina. In their elimination game they lost to Coastal Carolina to end their season.

Personnel

Starters

Roster

Game log

Rankings

Notes

References

External links 
 Virginia Baseball

Virginia
Virginia Cavaliers baseball seasons
Virginia Cavaliers baseball